Lindsay McKeown was a Northern Irish footballer who played in the Irish League for twelve seasons with Linfield throughout the 1980s. He won youth caps for Northern Ireland and four caps for the Irish League representative team.

He was a member of the Linfield team that won six League titles in a row from 1981-82 until 1986-87. In total he won eight Irish League championships, two Irish Cups, four Gold Cups, one Ulster Cup, one Irish League Cup, three County Antrim Shields and one Tyler All-Ireland Cup. He was the Ulster Footballer of the Year and Northern Ireland Football Writers' Association Player of the Year for 1979-80.

Sources
 M. Brodie (ed.), Northern Ireland Soccer Yearbook 2009-2010, p. 102. Belfast:Ulster Tatler Publications
 Irish League Footballing Greats

Association footballers from Northern Ireland
NIFL Premiership players
Ulster Footballers of the Year
Northern Ireland Football Writers' Association Players of the Year
Sheffield Wednesday F.C. players
Linfield F.C. players
Living people
1957 births
Irish League representative players
Association football midfielders